Jenna Syken (born October 19, 1990 in Chester, Pennsylvania, U.S.) is an American figure skater who competes for Israel. In November 2005 she placed 9th on the novice level in the 2006 Eastern Sectional Championships, failing to qualify for the 2006 U.S. Championships. In April 2006 Syken switched to competing for Israel, became a member of the IISF, competed in the 2006 Israel Nationals and won the Junior Ladies Champion title. Syken placed 37th at the 2007 World Junior Figure Skating Championships. Jenna's current coach and choreographer is Vacheslav Uchitel.

Her older sister, Shayna Syken, is a former competitive skater on the sectional level. Shayna is the 1998 Junior Olympic Juvenile Ladies Freeskate Champion and the 2002 South Atlantic Senior Ladies Champion.

Competitive highlights

 N = Novice level; J = Junior level

References

External links
 Jenna Syken's official site
 
 Q&A at Israel Ice Skating Federation
 Unseen Skaters biography

Israeli female single skaters
1990 births
Living people